is a former Japanese football player.

Club statistics

References

External links

1980 births
Living people
Association football people from Saitama Prefecture
Japanese footballers
J2 League players
Japan Football League players
Tokyo Verdy players
SC Sagamihara players
Zweigen Kanazawa players
Association football forwards